Blagrove may refer to:

People
 Henry Blagrove (1887–1939), rear-admiral of the British Royal Navy
 Henry Blagrove (violinist), (1811–1872), English violinist
 Mark Blagrove, British psychogist researching sleep and dreams.
 Michael Blagrove (1934-2016), athlete in the 1958 British Empire and Commonwealth Games
 William Blagrove (19th century), bookseller, publisher and librarian in Boston, Massachusetts, U.S.

Other uses
 Blagrove Common, a Site of Special Scientific Interest in Green End, Hertfordshire